Jefferson was the first American yacht. She was owned by George Crowninshield Jr. The yacht was primarily a pleasure craft, but she also fulfilled other purposes, including that of a rescue vessel, a privateer during the War of 1812, and a fishing boat.

History 
Jefferson was the first American boat designed specifically to use as a yacht. The yacht was constructed in Salem in 1801 for Crowninshield. She was christened Jefferson, named after the new U.S. President Thomas Jefferson. The next yacht of record was Diver, made for John Cox Stevens in 1802. The following yachts were Trouble, Wave, Onkahie, Ginicrack, and Maria. Jefferson proved herself to be a vessel that traveled well on the water. The infamous Cleopatra's Barge was built in 1816, some fifteen years after Jefferson was constructed.

Jefferson was originally rigged as a schooner and later was a sloop. The length of the sloop yacht was 35 feet 10 inches and her beam was 12 feet 4 inches. The yacht's depth was 6 feet and she had a tonnage of 22  American tons burden. Christopher Turne, a Salem shipwright, was the yacht's builder. She was launched March, 1801, from Turne's place where he made boats at Union Wharf. Crowninshield used Jefferson in Massachusetts Bay (then known as Salem Bay). The pleasure yacht was built for safety and comfort. The first American yacht for over a decade was enjoyed by Crowninshield and his family. He kept the boat stocked with provisions for everyone's enjoyment. One of Crowninshield's passions was that after a storm he would go out into Massachusetts Bay with the vessel and look for boats in trouble that needed help. 

Crowninshield was a firm believer in the policy of striking the enemy's vessels on the water first before they could do any damage. The family was among the first to fit out boats as privateers in the War of 1812. Jefferson was one of three such boats sent out by them. The other two were American and John. Jefferson was the second privateer commissioned in the war, and brought in the second prize, the schooner Nymph. She carried a crew of 30 men, a large number for a vessel 36 feet long; after one voyage it was decided she was too small for the work. Upon the death of Crowninshield, Jefferson was sold by the family in 1815 and became a fishing vessel. The yacht was useful for this purpose for many years. The yacht then belonged to Captain John Crowninshield Very of Marblehead, Massachusetts, and later to Caleb Johnson of Nahant, Massachusetts.

References

Sources 

Individual sailing yachts
Schooners of the United States
Sloops
Privateer ships of the United States
1801 ships
Ships built in Salem, Massachusetts